Bouteloua parryi, colloquially known as Parry's grama, is a grass species in the grama genus native to the southwestern United States and northern Mexico.

Description 
Flowers are born in inflorescences which consist of three to seven spicate branches per culm. They are blue-violet at maturity.

Taxonomy 
Several varieties exist. B. parryi var. parryi is a stoloniferous perennial which has papillose hairs on its upper glumes. B. parryi var. gentryi differs in being a tufted annual.

Distribution 
It is present in Texas, Arizona, New Mexico, and northern Mexico.

References 

repens
Grasses of North America
Grasses of Mexico
Grasses of the United States
Drought-tolerant plants
Warm-season grasses of North America
Grasses of South America